Drash  may refer to:

 Midrash, in Judaism, a method of exegesis of a biblical text
 DRASH, or Deployable Rapid Assembly Shelter, a brand of portable shelter
 Allan L. Drash (1931–2009), a pediatric endocrinologist from the United States
 Ultima: Escape from Mt. Drash (1983), a computer game